HMS Imperial was one of nine s built for the Royal Navy during the 1930s.

Description
The I-class ships were improved versions of the preceding H-class. They were powered by two Parsons geared steam turbines, each driving one propeller shaft, using steam provided by three Admiralty three-drum boilers. Their crew numbered 145 officers and ratings.

The ships mounted four 4.7-inch (120 mm) Mark IX guns in single mounts, designated 'A', 'B', 'X' and 'Y' from bow to stern. For anti-aircraft (AA) defence, they had two quadruple mounts for the 0.5 inch Vickers Mark III machine gun. The I class was fitted with two above-water quintuple torpedo tube mounts amidships for  torpedoes. One depth charge rack and two throwers were fitted; 16 depth charges were originally carried, but this increased to 35 shortly after the war began. The I-class ships were fitted with the ASDIC sound detection system to locate submarines underwater.

Construction and career
The ship was ordered under the 1935 Build Programme from Hawthorn Leslie, Hebburn, on 30 October 1935 with a delivery date of 30 April 1937. The ship was laid down on 26 January 1936 and launched on 11 December the same year, and was the first RN warship to carry the name. Imperial was completed late, on 30 June 1937, after a delay in the delivery of the gun mountings. The contract price was £257,117 excluding items supplied by Admiralty such as guns and communication equipment.

Imperial took part in the Norwegian Campaign and in August 1940 was redeployed to escort convoys to Malta. On 28 May 1941, Italian bombers from 41 Gruppo attacked Imperial and inflicted severe damage.

Notes

Bibliography
 
 
 
 
 
 
 
 

 

I-class destroyers of the Royal Navy
Ships built on the River Tyne
1936 ships
World War II destroyers of the United Kingdom
World War II shipwrecks in the Mediterranean Sea
Maritime incidents in May 1941
Destroyers sunk by aircraft
Ships sunk by Italian aircraft
Shipwrecks of Greece